Igenche (İgense) is a rural locality (a village) in Turumbetovsky Selsoviet, Aurgazinsky District, Bashkortostan, Russia. The population was 6 as of 2010. There is 1 street.

Geography 
Igenche is located 25 km west of Tolbazy (the district's administrative centre) by road. Dobrovolnoye is the nearest rural locality.

References 

Rural localities in Aurgazinsky District